S.C. Lusitânia EXPERT is a professional basketball team based in Angra do Heroísmo, Azores, Portugal. It plays in LCB. It's the highest ranked team from the Azores in Portuguese basketball.

Achievements
Portuguese League Cup: 1
2006–07
Portuguese Proliga: 1
2009–10

Notes

References

External links
Team profile at FPB.pt

Basketball teams in Portugal
Sports teams in the Azores